Claire Robinson is a television host, author and cook. She graduated from the French Culinary Institute in 2005 and was a television host of the Food Network series 5 Ingredient Fix.  On April 4, 2010, she debuted as the new host of Food Network Challenge replacing  Keegan Gerhard who hosted the program from 2005 to 2010. As of 2012, she is currently the co-host with Richard Corrigan of Chef Race: UK vs. US on BBC America.

Personal life

Robinson was born in Jacksonville, Florida to an ethnically diverse family. As a child her family moved frequently but eventually settled in Memphis, Tennessee. Her grandparents held Ph.D.'s in education and her grandfather was a former president of the University of Memphis. Robinson herself graduated from the University of Memphis with a degree in communications. 

In 2004, she moved to New York City and attended the French Culinary Institute; she graduated in November 2005. Along with being a private cook, she spent time working on culinary production teams for several cooking series, including Food Network’s Easy Entertaining with Michael Chiarello and PBS's Everyday Baking for Everyday Food.  She is also a two-time best selling author of culinary books.

References

Further reading

Claire on the Food Network

International Culinary Center alumni
Living people
People from Jacksonville, Florida
1978 births